Ololygon agilis, commonly known as the agile snouted treefrog, is a species of frog in the family Hylidae. It is endemic to Brazil, where it occurs along parts of the eastern coast.

This frog lives in bromeliads in forest habitat, especially in the restinga. It is a common frog with no major threats.

References

agilis
Endemic fauna of Brazil
Amphibians described in 1983
Taxonomy articles created by Polbot